Apetlon is a market town in the district of Neusiedl am See in Burgenland in Austria.  It is located in a region to the east of Lake Neusiedl (German: Neusiedler See; Hungarian: Fertő tó) which is named the Seewinkel (lake corner).

Geography
Apetlon is in the Neusiedler See-Seewinkel National Park on the eastern shore of Lake Neusiedl. The town itself is 120 m above sea level. Nearby, an area 114 m above sea level is the lowest elevation of Austria. Characteristic of the area are wide open plains and salt marsh flora, with many small salt lakes around. The Lange Lacke (Long Lake) is the largest of about forty such lakes nearby.

History
The community was first mentioned in records in 1318. In 1867, the Austrian Empire was dissolved, and Austria-Hungary was formed, with separate governments in Vienna and Budapest. Since 1898, due to the Pro-Magyar politics in Budapest, the Hungarian village name Bánfalu was used.

After the First World War, Burgenland was named Westungarn (West Hungary) in the 1919 Treaty of St. Germain and the Treaty of Trianon and was awarded to Austria in 1919.  Since 1921, the town has been part of the newly founded State of Burgenland. Apetlon has been a market town since 1991. In December 2001, the National Park Neusiedlersee was named a UNESCO World Heritage Site.

Economy and infrastructure

In Apetlon the primary business is wine production. The town is surrounded by vineyards. Tourism is also significant. Every year in May, many ornithologists come from all over Europe to see the rare birds.  Long before the establishment of the National Park, the Lange Lacke (Long Lake) already was an important nature reserve. Lange Lacke is the largest of about forty salt lakes near the town. The collection of scientific data on its bird life started more than 100 years ago.

The population of common starlings (Sturnus vulgaris) and grape growers are in conflict. Farmers and wineyard owners have gas (butane) propelled cannons and fully programmable electronic bird repel devices in the fields to frighten birds from eating the grapes. But also netting, private wine yard guards, hunters and airplanes are used to save as much as possible from the harvest.

Language
Apetlonerisch is a German dialect with borrowings from Hungarian.

References

External links
Official Website of the town
Website of the Tourism Association of Apetlon
Neusiedler See-Seewinkel National Park

Cities and towns in Neusiedl am See District